Schull and Skibbereen Railway 4 Erin was a  locomotive manufactured by Nasmyth, Wilson and Company of Patricroft near Manchester in 1888. It was the Schull and Skibbereen Railway's fourth locomotive.

In 1925, the railway was absorbed into the Great Southern Railways and renumbered 4, and placed in Class 4 or Class DN5 as the sole member. Following the GSR classification by wheel arrangement, "D" meaning a locomotive with a  arrangement, "N" meaning Narrow Gauge. The  wheel arrangement is unusual for tank locomotives but more common on narrow gauge than standard.

The locomotive was withdrawn and scrapped in 1954.

References

4-4-0T locomotives
Steam locomotives of Ireland
Nasmyth, Wilson and Company locomotives
Railway locomotives introduced in 1888
3 ft gauge locomotives
Scrapped locomotives